Tak Sum Wong (also known as Sam Wong, born 22 January 1965) is a Hong Kong windsurfer. He competed in the 1988 Summer Olympics, the 1992 Summer Olympics, and the 1996 Summer Olympics.

References

External links
 
 
 

1965 births
Living people
Hong Kong windsurfers
Hong Kong male sailors (sport)
Olympic sailors of Hong Kong
Sailors at the 1988 Summer Olympics – Division II
Sailors at the 1992 Summer Olympics – Lechner A-390
Sailors at the 1996 Summer Olympics – Mistral One Design
Asian Games silver medalists for Hong Kong
Asian Games medalists in sailing
Sailors at the 1994 Asian Games
Sailors at the 1998 Asian Games
Medalists at the 1994 Asian Games
Medalists at the 1998 Asian Games